The SS Panama Victory was a Victory ship built during World War II. She was launched by the California Shipbuilding Company on April 3, 1944 and completed on May 30, 1944. She was built in 115 days under the Emergency Shipbuilding program. The ship’s United States Maritime Commission designation was VC2-S-AP3, hull number 9 (V-9).  SS Panama Victory served in the Pacific Ocean during World War II. SS Panama Victory was ninth of the new 10,500-ton class ship to be known as Victory ships.  Victory ships were designed to replace the earlier Liberty Ships. Liberty ships were designed to be used just for WW2. Victory ships were designed to last longer and serve the US Navy after the war. The Victory ship differed from a Liberty ship in that they were: faster, longer and wider, taller, had a thinner stack set farther toward the superstructure and had a long raised forecastle. Engine was made by Joshua Hendy Iron Works Inc. of Sunnyvale, California.

SS Panama Victory was christened on April 3, 1944 by Mrs. Jimenez wife of ambassador Don Enrique A. Jimenez of Panama. The SS Panama Victory was one of a long line of Victory ships to leave the Calship building. The launching of The SS Panama Victory splashed into the water of Terminal Island to enter the Pacific War.

World War II
SS Panama Victory was operated by Marine Transport Line under charter with the Maritime Commission and War Shipping Administration. SS Panama Victory took to part in the Guadalcanal Campaign. The SS Panama Victory was in combat action in Lingayen Gulf in Philippines and survived an attack on January 12, 1945. She supplied a number of Landing Ship, Tank in WW2. On Feb. 28, 1945 she unloaded cargo on to other ships at the Ulithi atoll.

Post World War II
She was sold on 1946 to Holland America Line in Rotterdam and renamed SS Amsteldijk. In 1954 Holland America Line renamed her the SS Amsteldyk. In 1968 she was sold to a Panama company, Progressive Mariner S.A. and renamed SS Helena. In 1968 she was sold to Sincere Navigation Corp., in Keelung in Taiwan.  In 1973 she was scrapped in Taiwan.

Honors
Crew of Naval Armed Guards on the SS Panama Victory''' earned "Battle Stars" in World War II for war action during the Invasion of Lingayen Gulf from 4 Jan. 1945 to 18 Jan. 1945.

See also
List of Victory ships
 Type C1 ship
 Type C2 ship
 Type C3 ship

 References 

Sources
Sawyer, L.A. and W.H. Mitchell. Victory ships and tankers: The history of the ‘Victory’ type cargo ships and of the tankers built in the United States of America during World War II'', Cornell Maritime Press, 1974, 0-87033-182-5.
United States Maritime Commission: 
Victory Cargo Ships 

Victory ships
Ships built in Los Angeles
United States Merchant Marine
1944 ships
World War II merchant ships of the United States